The  is a DC electric multiple unit (EMU) commuter train type operated by Kyushu Railway Company (JR Kyushu) on Chikuhi Line and Fukuoka Subway Kuko Line through-running services in Kyushu, Japan, since 22 January 2000.

Design
The trains have lightweight stainless bodies with painted steel cab ends.

Operations
They are compatible with automatic train operation (ATO) used on the Fukuoka Subway tracks, and are also equipped for wanman driver only operation.

Formations
The fleet consists of three six-car sets, numbered K01 to K03 and based at Karatsu Depot. The sets are formed as shown below with four motored ("M") intermediate cars and non-powered driving trailer ("Tc") cars, with car 1 at the Nishi-Karatsu end.

Cars 2 and 5 are each equipped with two PS402K single-arm pantographs.

Interior
Passenger accommodation consists of longitudinal bench seating throughout. Car 1 has a universal access toilet.

History
The trains entered service on 22 January 2000. A toilet was retrofitted to car 1 in each set between 2003 and 2004 at JR Kyushu's Kokura Works.

Build details

The three sets were built by Kinki Sharyo between 1999 and 2002. The fleet build details are as shown below.

References

External links
 Kinki sharyo

Electric multiple units of Japan
Kyushu Railway Company
Train-related introductions in 2000
Kinki Sharyo multiple units
1500 V DC multiple units of Japan